The 7.7 cm Infanteriegeschütz L/20 was an infantry gun used by Germany in World War I. It was designed by Krupp to rectify the shortcomings of the 7.62 cm Infanteriegeschütz L/16.5.

Krupp mounted a shortened 7.7 cm Feldkanone 96 n.A on one of their mountain howitzer carriages. It fired the full range of ammunition of the FK 96 n.A., but generally only with a reduced charge, although it retained the capacity to fire the old full-power charges that gave a maximum muzzle velocity of 435 m/s (1427 ft/s). It also used a new full-power anti-tank round. Generally, it broke down into two loads for transport, although it could break down into a maximum of eight loads.

While generally liked by the troops, it was thought to be too heavy and slow to break down and reassemble. The German search for a better infantry gun that maximized the use of existing components continued with Krupp's 7.7 cm Infanteriegeschütz L/27.

References 

 Jäger, Herbert. German Artillery of World War One. Ramsbury, Marlborough, Wiltshire: Crowood Press, 2001 

World War I artillery of Germany
World War I infantry guns
77 mm artillery